The 2005 Samoa rugby union tour of Britain and Argentina was a series of matches played in November–December 2005 in Scotland, England and Argentina by Samoa national rugby union team. Samoa lost both match in Europe, but win against a young Argentine team (seven players made debuts).

Results

Scotland: 15. Chris Paterson, 14. Rory Lamont, 13. Marcus Di Rollo, 12. Andrew Henderson, 11. Sean Lamont, 10. Dan Parks, 9. Chris Cusiter, 8. Simon Taylor, 7. Ally Hogg, 6. Jason White (capt.), 5. Scott Murray, 4. Craig Hamilton, 3. Craig Smith, 2. Scott Lawson, 1. Allan Jacobsen – Replacements: 16. Dougie Hall, 17. Gavin Kerr, 18. Alastair Kellock, 19. Kelly Brown, 20. Mike Blair, 21. Phil Godman, 22. Hugo Southwell 
Samoa: 15. Roger Warren, 14. Lome Fa'atau, 13. Andy Tuilagi, 12. Eliota Fuimaono-Sapolu, 11. Alesana Tuilagi, 10. Tanner Vili, 9. Garrick Cowley, 8. Daniel Farani, 7. Iosefa Taina , 6. Semo Sititi (capt), 5. Jonny Fa'amatuainu, 4. Daniel Leo, 3. Census Johnston, 2. Mahonri Schwalger, 1. Justin Va'a – Replacements: 16. Loleni Tafunai, 17. Kas Lealamanua, 18. Leo Lafaiali'i, 19. Paul Tupai, 20. Notise Tauafao, 21. Aukuso Collins, 22. Sailosi Tagicakibau 

England: 15. Josh Lewsey, 14. Mark Cueto, 13. James Simpson-Daniel, 12. Mike Tindall, 11. Tom Voyce, 10. Charlie Hodgson, 9. Harry Ellis, 8. Martin Corry (capt.), 7. Lewis Moody , 6. Pat Sanderson, 5. Louis Deacon, 4. Steve Borthwick, 3. Matt Stevens, 2. Steve Thompson, 1. Andrew Sheridan – Replacements: 16. Lee Mears, 17. Perry Freshwater, 18. Simon Shaw, 19. James Forrester, 20. Peter Richards, 21. Olly Barkley, 22. Tom Varndell 
Samoa: 15. Sailosi Tagicakibau, 14. Lome Fa'atau, 13. Elvis Seveali'i, 12. Eliota Fuimaono-Sapolu, 11. Alesana Tuilagi , 10. Tanner Vili , 9. Steve So'oialo, 8. Daniel Farani, 7. Semo Sititi (capt.), 6. Leo Lafaiali'i, 5. Pelu Taele-Pavihi, 4. Daniel Leo, 3. Census Johnston, 2. Mahonri Schwalger, 1. Justin Va'a  – Replacements: 16. Loleni Tafunai, 17. Kas Lealamanua, 18. Paul Tupai, 19. Jonny Fa'amatuainu, 20. Garrick Cowley, 21. Andy Tuilagi, 22. Lolo Lui

Argentina: 15. Francisco Bosch, 14. Horacio Agulla, 13. Miguel Avramovic, 12. Gonzalo Tiesi, 11. Pablo Gomez Cora, 10. Juan Fernández Miranda (capt.), 9. Lucio Lopez Fleming, 8. Juan Martín Fernández Lobbe , 7. Agustin Creevy, 6. Santiago Sanz, 5. Mariano Sambucetti, 4. Jaime Arocena Mesones, 3. Marcos Ayerza, 2. Agustin Costa Repetto, 1. Gaston de Robertis – Replacements: 16. Matias Cortese , 17. Sebastien Rondinelli, 20. Nicolas Vergallo – Unused: 18. Santiago Artese, 19. Álvaro Galindo, 21. Marcelo Bosch, 22. Gonzalo Sarasqueta
Samoa: 15. Lolo Lui, 14. Lome Fa'atau, 13. Andy Tuilagi, 12. Eliota Fuimaono-Sapolu, 11. Sailosi Tagicakibau, 10. Roger Warren, 9. Garrick Cowley , 8. Daniel Farani, 7. Semo Sititi (capt), 6. Paul Tupai, 5. Pelu Taele-Pavihi, 4. Daniel Leo, 3. Census Johnston , 2. Mahonri Schwalger, 1. Justin Va'a – Replacements: 16. Loleni Tafunai, 17. Tamato Leupolu, 18. Jonny Fa'amatuainu, 19. Ulia Ulia, 20. Notise Tauafao, 21. Aukuso Collins, 22. Kiri Mariner

References

2005 rugby union tours
2005
2005 in Oceanian rugby union
rugby union
2005–06 in British rugby union
2005–06 in Scottish rugby union
2005–06 in English rugby union
2005 in Argentine rugby union
2005
2005
2005
2005